This Kiss may refer to:

 "This Kiss" (Carly Rae Jepsen song), 2012
 "This Kiss" (Faith Hill song), 1998